This is a list of Number 1 hit singles in 1961 in New Zealand from the Lever Hit Parade.

Chart

References

 Number One Singles Of 1961

1961 in New Zealand
1961 record charts
1961
1960s in New Zealand music